Daria Kasatkina won the women's singles title at the 2021 St. Petersburg Ladies' Trophy, after Margarita Gasparyan retired from the final with the scoreline at 6–3, 2–1.

Kiki Bertens was the two-time defending champion, but she chose not to participate.

This was the first tournament since Oakland in 1993 in which seven of the eight quarterfinalists were all from the same country. It was also the first tournament in WTA history in which all four semifinalists represented Russia.

Seeds

Draw

Finals

Top half

Bottom half

Qualifying

Seeds

Qualifiers

Lucky loser

Qualifying draw

First qualifier

Second qualifier

Third qualifier

Fourth qualifier

Fifth qualifier

Sixth qualifier

References

External Links
 Main draw
 Qualifying draw

2021 WTA Tour
2021 St. Petersburg Ladies' Trophy – 1